The S-V (pronounced "S-five") was the third stage of the Saturn I rocket. It was built by Convair. It was designed to use two RL-10A-1 engines fueled by liquid hydrogen (LH2) and liquid oxygen (LOX) in tanks utilizing a common bulkhead to separate the propellants.

History 
Convair Astronautics was awarded a contract to deliver the S-V stage for the Saturn I. The stage was intended to boost lift capacity for U.S. military launches in the 1960s.  The S-V would ultimately fly as the third stage on early launches of the Saturn I. Convair delivered two S-V stages in February 1961 with one being flown on SA-1 attached to an also inert S-IV, the second was used for dynamic testing of the complete Saturn I before being later flown. In May 1961 NASA eliminated the requirement for all Saturn I launches to be flown with S-V's by flying in a two-stage only version. Despite this, the stage would fly four times in total. With the introduction of the Saturn IB and the needs of the military fulfilled on other launches, all further launches would be on either the Saturn IB or Saturn V, each of which did not include the S-V. A version of this stage was also used on the Atlas-LV3C as the Centaur, modern derivatives of which are still flown today making it the only Saturn rocket stage still currently operating.

Flight history 
Ultimately, the S-V would go on to fly four times between 1961 and 1964. Each of which were flown on suborbital test flights of the Saturn I. Because of the suborbital nature of these flights, each S-V was filled with water to act as ballast, making the stage inert. The water was released in space twice for Project Highwater. Modern derivatives of the stage are still in use today on the Atlas V and the planned Vulcan Centaur.

References 



Rocket stages
NASA space launch vehicles